The Bailey and Massingill General Store is a historic commercial building in downtown Lakeview, Oregon, United States. Lakeview's first commercial establishment opened on the same site in 1876, and was purchased by partners Harry Bailey and W. A. Massingill in 1897. A large fire on the night of May 22, 1900, destroyed much of Lakeview, and Bailey and Massingill suffered the largest financial loss in town ($18,000) with the complete destruction of their store. The partners immediately rebuilt their business, opening the present building on the same site in the same year. Drawing lessons from the fire, they incorporated a unique set of fire preventive features into the new building, including metal-sheathed walls and a fire awning (no longer present) that could be dropped to protect the windows and entry. With these features, the building successfully survived another large fire in 1902, and continued as one of Lakeview's most important commercial enterprises.

The store was listed on the National Register of Historic Places in 1984.

See also
National Register of Historic Places listings in Lake County, Oregon

References

External links

1900 establishments in Oregon
Buildings and structures in Lakeview, Oregon
Commercial buildings completed in 1900
Commercial buildings on the National Register of Historic Places in Oregon
National Register of Historic Places in Lake County, Oregon